SLNS Sindurala pennant number P624 (Sindurala, in English: Soft Waves) is an advanced offshore patrol vessel (AOPV) of the Sri Lanka Navy.

In February 2014 contract was signed by Government of Sri Lanka and Goa Shipyard for the two Advanced Offshore Patrol Vessels (AOPVs) for the Sri Lanka Navy and the production of the first AOPV began on 15 May 2014.

Operations
After the Sri Lanka Navy received the ship, it was equipped with the Israel Intercepting Equipment. Although the ships of the Saryu class mounts a OTO Melara 76 mm as its main armament, the Navy decided to mount a Chinese  Type 76 twin 37 mm naval gun as its main armament and two Typhoon Mk-30c equipped with the 30mm Mk44 Bushmaster II as its secondary armament in place of the AK-630 CIWS used in the Indian Navy. It was commissioned into the navy on 19 April 2018.

As a first overseas deployment, SLNS Sindurala took part in Australia maritime exercise, KAKADU 2018 with a complement of 150, including 26 officers and 124 sailors.

Gallery

References

External links
Sri Lanka Navy

Ships of the Sri Lanka Navy
Naval ships of Sri Lanka
2016 ships
Ships built in India
Saryu-class patrol vessels of Sri Lanka